Anthony Dwayne Montgomery (born June 2, 1971) is an American film and television actor, as well as graphic novelist. He is best known for his portrayal of Ensign Travis Mayweather on the UPN science fiction television series Star Trek: Enterprise (the fifth live-action series in the Star Trek franchise). Montgomery played Andre Maddox on the ABC daytime soap opera General Hospital from 2015 to 2019. He is the grandson of guitarist Wes Montgomery.

Early life
Montgomery was born in Indianapolis, Indiana. He graduated from Ball State University with a degree in performance theater and drama. Montgomery did stand-up comedy briefly after graduation, before moving to California.

Career

Film and television
Sometimes credited as "A.T. Montgomery", his first starring role was in the horror-comedy Leprechaun in the Hood (2000), for which he also contributed writing and vocals for several songs. He had a recurring role on the television series Popular before being cast in Star Trek: Enterprise in 2001. In 2004, he returned to stand-up comedy.

Montgomery starred in the film I'm Through with White Girls in 2007. In January 2009, Montgomery appeared in an episode of the Fox series House. In 2013, he appeared briefly as a dud romantic-interest in the show Baby Daddy (season 2, ep. 1), playing a handsome but boring drycleaner the show's (young) grandmother was interested in. In 2013 he also produced and starred in the independent film Chariot, about seven amnesiac strangers who awake on an airliner mid-flight.

In 2015, Montgomery joined the cast of the ABC daytime soap General Hospital playing Dr. Andre Maddox.

Stage
In 2004, Montgomery returned to the stage in Los Angeles, producing the show Dutchman by LeRoi Jones. He has also performed in a number of stage productions. His other stage credits include productions of Working, Oliver, Othello, and Much Ado About Nothing. In the summer of 2005, Montgomery returned to Indiana to star in theatrical fundraisers for charity.

Music
Montgomery has produced one CD of his own music, What You Know About..., featuring four songs about Star Trek themes. In April 2007 Anthony Montgomery signed with the Germany-based AGR Television Records. His (Hip-Hop) debut-album,  titled A.T., was released in November 2008. In the TV series Single Ladies that he had a recurring role in, a single he wrote and performed, entitled "Stimulation", was included for the music-heavy show's mood soundtrack for Episode 9. The single also featured rapper J. Naught-T.

Writing
In 2013, Montgomery created Miles Away, a hoped-to-be media franchise, about a teenager with special needs who battles aliens. A graphic novel was published in June 2013.

Personal life
Anthony Montgomery married Adrienne Montgomery in August 2007. They have a son together (born 2010), and he has a daughter from a previous relationship. His grandfather was jazz musician Wes Montgomery. 
Montgomery is a martial arts student. He studied Hapkido and Koga Ryu Ninjutsu.

Filmography

Film

Television

Awards and nominations

References

Sources

External links
 
 

1971 births
Living people
African-American male actors
African-American male songwriters
American hapkido practitioners
American stand-up comedians
American male soap opera actors
American male television actors
Ball State University alumni
Male actors from Indianapolis
Musicians from Indianapolis
Songwriters from Indiana
Comedians from Indiana
21st-century American comedians
21st-century African-American male singers